The 1973 Camellia Bowl was the NCAA Division II Football Championship game following the 1973 season, between the Louisiana Tech Bulldogs and the Western Kentucky Hilltoppers.

Notable participants
Notable participants for Louisiana Tech include Fred Dean, Roger Carr, Pat Tilley, Roland Harper, Mike Barber, John Henry White, Billy Ryckman, Maxie Lambright, Mickey Slaughter, Pat Patterson, and Pat Collins.

Game summary

Scoring summary

Statistics

References

Camellia Bowl
NCAA Division II Football Championship Games
Camellia Bowl
Louisiana Tech Bulldogs football bowl games
Western Kentucky Hilltoppers football bowl games
American football in Sacramento, California
Sports competitions in Sacramento, California
Camellia Bowl
Camellia Bowl